McVittie is a surname. Notable people with the surname include:

Charles McVittie (1908–1973), English cricketer
George C. McVittie (1904–1988), British mathematician and cosmologist
Joan McVittie (born 1952), British schoolteacher
Wilfrid McVittie (1906–1980), British diplomat

See also
2417 McVittie, a main-belt asteroid
McVitie